Karim Haddouche (born September 16, 1975 in Marseille, France), more commonly known as Sat l'Artificier or Sat, is a French rapper of Algerian origin and is a member of the group Fonky Family.

Life

Born in Marseille to an Algerian father and French mother of Corsican descent, Sat discovered rap at an early age. In 1993, along with his neighborhood friends Le Rat Luciano, Don Choa and Menzo, they created the group Fonky Family. After meeting with IAM's Akhenaton (rapper) they started working on their first album. Since then, the group has released 4 albums and are considered one of the biggest rap groups in France.

Discography

Albums
As part of Fonky Family
Si Dieu veut... (1998)
Art de rue (2001)
Marginale musique (2006)

Solo
 Dans mon monde (2002)
 Second souffle (2008)
 Diaspora (2010)

Others
 Dans mon monde (Deluxe Edition) (2003)

EPs
As part of Fonky FamilyHors Série Vol. 1 (1999)Hors Série Vol. 2 (2001)

Solo
 Toujours Dans Mon Monde (EP)'' (2003)

References

External links
 Official Website
 Official Skyblog

1975 births
Living people
French people of Kabyle descent
Musicians from Marseille
French people of Corsican descent
Rappers from Bouches-du-Rhône